Acid attack usually refers to acid throwing, a form of violent assault.

Acid attack may also refer to:
 Acid erosion to teeth, caused by bacterial acid; see also tooth decay
 Harmful effects of acidic soils to aquatic ecosystems and concrete infrastructures